Ziya Erdal (born 5 January 1988) is a Turkish professional footballer who currently plays as a left-back for Sivasspor in the Süper Lig.

Honours
Sivasspor
 Turkish Cup: 2021–22

References

External links
 
 

1988 births
Living people
People from Zara, Turkey
Turkish footballers
Turkey B international footballers
Sivasspor footballers
Kırşehirspor footballers
Anadolu Üsküdar 1908 footballers
Süper Lig players
Turkey under-21 international footballers
Association football fullbacks